Like Cotton Twines is a 2016 film directed by Ghanaian-American filmmaker Leila Djansi.

Plot 
The movie gives insight of an American teacher who comes to Ghana to teach and later finds out that one of his female student who is 14 years is to engage in a trokosi system of practice. The reason is for her to marry a fetish priest for the atonement of the sins of her father.

Cast 

 Irene Adotey
 Adjetey Anang
 Miranda Bailey
 David Dontoh
 Ophelia Klenam Dzidzornu
 Jay Ellis
 Aiyanna Johns
 Ludwig Mawuli Kalms
 Luckei E. Lawson
 Yvonne Okoro
 Mawuli Semevo

References 

Films set in Ghana
Ghanaian documentary films
Films directed by Leila Djansi